Paul Rowe may refer to:

 Paul Rowe (Canadian football) (1917–1990), Canadian professional football fullback
 Paul Rowe (ice hockey) (1914–1993), American ice hockey player
 Paul Rowe (educationalist), Irish chief executive officer of Educate Together
 Paul Rowe (swimmer), New Zealand-Australian swimmer
 Paul Rowe (Australian footballer) (born 1941), Australian footballer
 Paul Rowe (rower) (1949–2015), Australian rower and rowing coach

See also
Rowe (surname)